Christopher Winter may refer to:
 Christopher Winter (pirate), English pirate
 Christopher Winter (artist), English artist
 W. Christopher Winter, American sleep researcher, neurologist and author

See also
 Chris Winter (disambiguation)